The 2023 Michigan State Spartans football team will represent Michigan State University in the East Division of the Big Ten Conference during the 2023 NCAA Division I FBS football season. The Spartans will be led by Mel Tucker in his fourth year as head coach. The Spartans will play their home games at Spartan Stadium in East Lansing, Michigan.

Previous season
The Spartans finished the 2022 season 5–7, 3–6 in Big Ten play to finish in fifth place in the East division. They failed to qualify for a bowl game for the second time in three years.

Offseason

2023 NFL draft 
Following the conclusion of the season, several players declared for the NFL draft:

 Daniel Barker, tight end
 Kendell Brooks, safety
 Jarek Broussard, running back
 Jarret Horst, offensive lineman
 Jayden Reed, wide receiver
 Jacob Slade, defensive tackle
 Ben VanSumeren, linebacker

Coaching changes 
On January 4, defensive line coach Marco Coleman left MSU to join his alma mater, Georgia Tech, as their defensive line coach. On January 25, the school named Stanford defensive line coach Diron Reynolds the team's new defensive line coach.

Transfers

Outgoing

Source

Incoming

Source

Personnel

Players

Coaching staff

Schedule

References

Michigan State
Michigan State Spartans football seasons
Michigan State Spartans football